Almanac was a Canadian documentary television series which aired on CBC Television in 1961.

Premise
The series was a successor to Junior Roundup. It consisted of documentary segments geared towards secondary school audiences. The diverse range of topics included northern Canadian freight trains, the Alaska Highway, NORAD's operations, and HMS Bounty in Tahiti.

Almanac was broadcast Mondays at 4:30 p.m.

References

External links
 

CBC Television original programming
1961 Canadian television series debuts
1961 Canadian television series endings